Screamers: The Hunting is a 2009 American science fiction horror film directed by Sheldon Wilson and starring Gina Holden, Jana Pallaske, Greg Bryk, Stephen Amell and Lance Henriksen. The film is a sequel to the 1995 film Screamers and was released on DVD on February 17, 2009.

Plot
A group of humans arrive on Sirius 6-B to investigate an SOS signal sent out from the planet, which has been supposedly deserted since the destruction of the man-made weapons known as "screamers". Once the squad arrives, they find a group of human survivors eking out an existence in an old military outpost, but more important, they discover that the threat of the screamers has become even more insidious, now that they're able to morph into human form.

Cast
 Gina Holden as Lieutenant Victoria Bronte
 Stephen Amell as Guy
 Jana Pallaske as Schwartz
 Tim Rozon as Madden
 Greg Bryk	as Commander Andy Sexton
 Lance Henriksen as Orsow
 Christopher Redman as Rafe Danielli
 Jody Richardson as Soderquist
 Dave Lapommeray as Sergeant Romulo
 Holly Uloth as Hannah
 Darryl Hopkins as Dwight
 Stephen Lush as Bryce
 Lynley Hall as Jessie
 Shaun Johnston as Haggard Man
 Ruth Lawrence as Cave Woman

Reception
Bulletproof Action said, "It wasn’t award-winning or anything but there were enough good things to outweigh the bad. If you get a chance, check it out."

References

External links

 

2009 direct-to-video films
2009 films
Direct-to-video sequel films
American science fiction action films
Films based on short fiction
Films based on science fiction short stories
Films based on works by Philip K. Dick
Films set on fictional planets
2000s science fiction horror films
2000s English-language films
Films directed by Sheldon Wilson
2000s American films
Sony Pictures direct-to-video films